The Glienicke Bridge is a bridge across the Havel River in Germany, connecting the Wannsee district of Berlin with the Brandenburg capital Potsdam. It is named after nearby Glienicke Palace. The current bridge, the fourth on the site, was completed in 1907, although major reconstruction was necessary after it was damaged during World War II.

During the Cold War, as this portion of the Havel River formed the border between West Berlin and East Germany, the bridge was used several times for the exchange of captured spies and thus became known as the Bridge of Spies.

Location

The bridge spans the Havel narrows between the Jungfernsee (lake) to the north and the Glienicker Lake to the south. It carries the Bundesstraße 1 highway. The Glienicke Palace and Jagdschloss Glienicke are situated (across the highway from each other) near the east (Berlin) end of the bridge. Potsdam tram route 93 from Potsdam main station and Berlin bus route 316 from Wannsee station terminate and interconnect at a tram stop on the Potsdam end of the bridge. The respective Potsdam and Wannsee stations are served by the Berlin S-Bahn and by longer distance trains.

History

A first wooden bridge across the Havel River at this location was built about 1660, in order to reach the hunting grounds around Stolpe. By the early 1800s, a new, non-wooden bridge was needed to accommodate the massive increase in traffic on the chaussee between the Prussian capital Berlin and the Hohenzollern residence in Potsdam. The architect Karl Friedrich Schinkel designed a brick and wood bascule bridge, which was finished in 1834. By the early 20th century, Schinkel's bridge was no longer able to handle the increased volume in traffic, and operating the moveable sections of the bridge caused delays in steamer traffic on the Havel River.

In 1904, the Prussian government held a design competition to replace Schinkel's bridge with a modern, iron bridge. The Johann Caspar Harkort Company of Duisburg submitted the winning design, and the present-day bridge was inaugurated on 16 November 1907.

The German film studio UFA shot the film Unter den Brücken (Under the Bridges) at the Glienicke Bridge in 1944 and 1945. At the end of April 1945, an unexploded shell severely damaged the bridge. The reconstruction of the steel bridge was not completed until 1949, after the establishment of West Germany and East Germany. The East German government named it the “Bridge of Unity" as the border between East Germany and Western Allied-occupied West Berlin ran across the middle of the bridge.

Cold War
During the early years of the Cold War, the bridge was mainly used by the Allies as a link between their Berlin sections and the military liaison missions in Potsdam. German residents of the two cities more frequently used the S-Bahn suburban rail to travel between Berlin and Potsdam. On 27 May 1952, East German authorities closed the bridge to citizens of West Berlin and West Germany. The bridge was closed to East German citizens after the construction of the Berlin Wall in August 1961. Only Allied military personnel and foreign diplomats were allowed to access the bridge at any time.

Of all the checkpoints between West Berlin and East Berlin, as well as those between West Berlin and East Germany, the Glienicke Bridge had the uniqueness of being the only such checkpoint of not only having a Soviet presence, but also of being under full Soviet control; all other checkpoints were under East German control, and had no Soviet presence.

By the 1970s, the bridge had outlived its projected lifespan and needed significant repairs. The cost of these repairs became a focus of a dispute between the government of West Berlin and the government of East Germany. In 1980 the West Berlin government repaired its half of the bridge, and in 1985 the West Berlin government paid for repairs to the East German half of the bridge in exchange for formally renaming the bridge "Glienicke Bridge" from "Bridge of Unity."

On the evening of 10 November 1989, one day after the opening of the Berlin Wall, the Glienicke Bridge was reopened for pedestrians. Border fortifications and barricades were dismantled as a part of German reunification in 1990.

Bridge of Spies
Because the Glienicke Bridge was a restricted border crossing between the Eastern Bloc (namely Potsdam in East Germany) and territory affiliated with the Western powers (namely the American sector of West Berlin), the Americans and Soviets used it for the exchange of captured spies during the Cold War. Reporters began calling it the "Bridge of Spies." When this name was later used as the title for various works, it was often taken to be a pun on "bridge of sighs" a name applied first to the bridge in Venice and then to others.

The first prisoner exchange took place on 10 February 1962. The Americans released Rudolf Abel, convicted for spying for the Soviet Union in 1957, in exchange for Gary Powers, the pilot of a U-2 spy plane shot down in 1960.

When US military attache Arthur D. Nicholson was shot by a Soviet sentry in March 1985, his body was returned to the US Army at the Glienicke Bridge.

On 12 June 1985, there was a swap of 23 American agents held in Eastern Europe for Polish agent Marian Zacharski and another three Soviet agents arrested in the West. The exchange was the result of three years of negotiation.

The final exchange was also the most public. On 11 February 1986 the human rights campaigner (refusenik) and political prisoner Anatoly Shcharansky (now known as Natan Sharansky) and three Western agents were exchanged for Karl Koecher and four other Eastern agents.

In popular culture

The Glienicke Bridge as a venue for prisoner exchange has appeared frequently in fiction, for example in the 1966 Harry Palmer film, Funeral in Berlin, based on the novel of the same name by Len Deighton.

The popular nickname "Bridge of Spies" was used by the British band T'Pau as the name of the title track on their first album. The usage is metaphorical, referring to a "walk to freedom" but in the context of a long-dreamt-of relationship.

The bridge is referenced in the children's TV series Codename: Kids Next Door, specifically when a bridge in a local mall is used to exchange a spy from the KND in return for a spy from the Teenagers, a parody of real-life prisoner exchanges.

There is a brief reference to the bridge in the sixth episode of the first season of Archer, when Mallory Archer and her long-time lover (and head of the KGB) Major Nikolai Jakov mention meeting there "one moonlit night" when they both worked on covert operations in Berlin, presumably during the Cold War.

The 2015 film Bridge of Spies, directed by Steven Spielberg and starring Tom Hanks, features the Powers–Abel prisoner exchange on the bridge as a major plot element.

Gallery

See also
 Bridge of No Return
 Hiền Lương Bridge
 Lo Wu Bridge

References

External links

 Potsdam from Above - Glienicker Bruecke
 
 "23rd Hour" describes Glienicke Bridge in 1969
 The House at the Bridge The history of the postwar kindergarten at the foot of the bridge

Bridges in Berlin
Bridges completed in 1907
Checkpoints
Berlin border crossings
Buildings and structures in Steglitz-Zehlendorf
Buildings and structures in Potsdam
Tourist attractions in Potsdam
Tourist attractions in Berlin
1907 establishments in Germany